The Government Medical College, Srikakulam (formerly known as Rajiv Gandhi Institute of Medical Sciences) is a medical college located in Srikakulam, Andhra Pradesh, India.  It is affiliated to Dr. NTR University of Health Sciences.It is one of the two government medical colleges in Uttarandhra region.

History 
The institute was inaugurated by then Chief Minister Dr. Y. S. Rajasekhar Reddy. The name  Rajiv Gandhi Institute of Medical Sciences, Srikakulam has been converted to Government Medical College, Srikakulam. Hence the post of 'Director' has been changed to 'Principal'.

Intake

The institute has started with an intake capacity of 100 (MBBS seats). It is increased to 150 from the academic year 2019-2020. It is also planning to start PG courses with an intake of 11 from the academic year 2019-20.

These are the batch names of the college from 2008 onwards.

References

http://dme.ap.nic.in/nodaldme/first_regulations_g.o.__memo.html

External links
 GMC Srikakulam

Medical colleges in Andhra Pradesh
Universities and colleges in Srikakulam district
Educational institutions established in 2008
2008 establishments in Andhra Pradesh
Srikakulam
Uttarandhra